Football at the 1978 Asian Games was held in Bangkok, Thailand from 10 to 20 December 1978.

Medalists

Draw
The teams were seeded based on their final ranking at the 1974 Asian Games.

Group A
 
 
 

Group B
 
 
 
 

Group C
 
 
 
 

Group D

Squads

Results

Preliminary round

Group A

Group B

Group C

Group D

Semifinals

Group 1

Group 2

Final round

Bronze medal match

Gold medal match

Final standing

References

 RSSSF
 Indian football team at the Asian Games: 1978 Bangkok

 
1978 Asian Games events
1978
Asia
1978 Asian Games